Miss Grand Venezuela 2022 was the first edition of the Miss Grand Venezuela beauty pageant, held at Teatro Municipal of Caracas in the Capital District on 13 August 2022. Twenty-two national delegates, chosen through various state pageants, participated in the contest, of which, Valentina Martínez of Anzoátegui was named the winner and was crowned by Vanessa Coello Miss Grand Venezuela 2021, she will later represent the country at Miss Grand International 2023, which was scheduled to be held in October 2023 in Vietnam.

In addition to crowning the winner, the country representative for the 10th-anniversary edition of Miss Grand International, Sabrina Deraneck of Mérida, was also revealed; Deraneck had been elected the first runner-up at another national pageant, 2022 El Concurso by Osmel Sousa, and was later appointed the country representative by the Venezuelan Miss Grand licensee, George Wittles. However, in early September – one month before the commencement of the international tournament, Deraneck resigned the title due to health problems, caused the organizer to assign Luiseth Materán Miss Universe Venezuela 2021 as the replacement.

The grand final round of the pageant was hosted by Vanessa Coello, Leo Aldana, and Yanuaria Verde; and was beamed live to a virtual audience worldwide via the pageant YouTube channel, named GrandTV-VE. Originally, the winner of the competition was expected to participate at the Miss Grand International 2022 but the organizer later decided to appoint a new country representative for such an international event and planned to send this edition winner to the 2023 competition in Vietnam instead.

Background

History
After hosting the Miss Grand International 2019 pageant, the licensee of the national pageant in Venezuela was transferred to the Venezuelan jewelry designer, George Wittles, who has also acted as the crown sponsor for the Miss Grand International since 2019. Wittles planned to conduct the first Miss Grand Venezuela contest in 2021 by distributing the regional license to state organizers to select their representatives for such a national contest, however, due to the COVID-19 pandemic, the pageant was instead postponed to July 2022 and then to August.

Selection of contestants
The national aspirants for the Miss Grand Venezuela 2022 pageant was be chosen through the state pageants held by several local licensees, who in some cases are responsible for more than one state, such as the state pageant organized in Táchira, Miss Grand Los Andes; four state representatives were determined through such the contest, moreover, one of its finalists was later designated to represent the neighboring state due to a lacking of state licensee. However, some delegates, such as the representative of Lara, Nueva Esparta, Sucre, and Zulia, were appointed state or regional titles because of the absence of a state pageant in their area.

Results summary

Candidates

 Replacement
 : "Betzy Capicciotti" resigned her state title, six months after winning the state pageant on 26 June 2021 for undisclosed reasons,  caused the state licensee to appoint "Marian Pérez", the fourth runner-up, to participate in the national pageant instead.

References

External links

 

Miss Grand Venezuela
Beauty pageants in Venezuela
Venezuelan awards
Grand Venezuela